Timothy Theodore Schenken  (born 26 September 1943) is a former racing driver from Sydney, Australia. He participated in 36 Formula One World Championship Grands Prix, debuting on 16 August 1970. He achieved one career podium at the 1971 Austrian Grand Prix, and scored a total of seven championship points. He did however have two non-championship race podiums – he finished third in the 1971 BRDC International Trophy and third in the 1972 International Gold Cup.

Career

 Schenken's lower formula results included winning the 1968 British Lombank Formula Three Championship, winning the 1968 Grovewood Award, winning the 1968 British Formula Ford Championship, winning the 1968 ER Hall Formula Three Trophy, winning the 1969 French Craven A Formula Three Championship, winning the 1969 Greater London Formula Three Trophy, finishing fourth in the 1971 European Formula Two Championship and finishing third in the 1972 Brazilian Formula Two International Tournament.

He had a great deal of success in Sports Cars racing for Ferrari. In 1972 he won the Buenos Aires 1000 km and Nürburgring 1000 km races, finished second in the Daytona 6hour, Sebring 12hour, Brands Hatch 1000 km and the Watkins Glen 6hour, and finished third at the Monza 1000 km and Zeltweg 1000 km races. 1973 saw him finish second at the Vallelunga 6hour and Monza 1000 km races. In 1975 and 1976 he finished second in the Nürburgring 1000 km and then in 1977 he won the Nürburgring 1000 km race for a second time. At Le Mans in 1976 he finished second in the GT Class and was 16th overall. In 1975 he was runner up in the European GT Championship and finished third in the championship in 1976.

In 1974 he co-founded Tiga Race Cars in Britain with New Zealander Howden Ganley, whose cars had great success in the Sports 2000 category, and constructed cars for a number of over formulae. He is currently employed each year as the Race Director for the Australian V8 Supercar Championship Series. He also is a director of Motorsport Australia, the Clerk of the Course at the Australian Grand Prix and was the Clerk of the Course for the inaugural 2008 Singapore Grand Prix.

As of the 2020 season, Schenken is one of only five Australians who have stood on the podium for a Formula One Grand Prix. The others are Grand Prix winners Mark Webber and Daniel Ricciardo, as well as World Champions Sir Jack Brabham and Alan Jones.

On 16 June 2016, Tim Schenken was awarded the Medal of the Order of Australia in the General Division as part of the Queen's Birthday honours. He is currently the Director of Race Operations for Motorsport Australia.

He is married and has a son, Guido, and identical twin daughters, Laura and Natalie.

Career summary

Complete Formula One World Championship results
(key)

Complete 24 Hours of Le Mans results

References

Australian Formula One drivers
European Formula Two Championship drivers
Grovewood Award winners
British Formula Three Championship drivers
Australian Formula 2 drivers
1943 births
Living people
24 Hours of Le Mans drivers
Australian people of German descent
Racing drivers from Sydney
Williams Formula One drivers
Brabham Formula One drivers
Surtees Formula One drivers
Trojan Formula One drivers
Team Lotus Formula One drivers
World Sportscar Championship drivers
Recipients of the Medal of the Order of Australia